Trar Dewan is a village in Poonch District, Azad Kashmir, Pakistan. Found to the south of Rawalakot, it is one of many suburban villages surrounding the city.

Demography 
The village has a population of around 10,000 people, who belong to various tribes such as the Sudhan, Quraishi, Khwaja, Mangral, Sulehria, Maldiyal Mughal, Dhund Abbasi, Gakhars and Dar.

Education 
The village's means of education consist of 2 middle schools, Poonch Medical College, a government run polytechnic institute, and the nearby University of Poonch. Approximately 90% of the population are educated. Graduates include doctors, engineers, professors and businessmen.

References 

Populated places in Poonch District, Pakistan